The Volkswagen XL1 (VW 1-litre) is a two-person limited production diesel-powered plug-in hybrid produced by Volkswagen. The XL1 car was designed to be able to travel 100 km on 1 litre of diesel, while being both roadworthy and practical. To achieve such economy, it was produced with lightweight materials, a streamlined body and an engine and transmission designed and tuned for economy. The concept car was modified first in 2009 as the L1 and again in 2011 as the XL1.

The XL1 was released to retail customers in Germany in June 2014.

History

Prototype 
The prototype VW 1-litre concept car was shown to the public in April 2002 when Ferdinand Piëch, then chairman of the board of management, drove the concept between Wolfsburg and Hamburg as part of the Volkswagen annual meeting of stockholders.

For aerodynamics, the car seats two in tandem, rather than side-by-side. There are no rear view mirrors and it instead uses cameras and electronic displays. The rear wheels are close together to allow a streamlined body. The total aerodynamic drag is minimal because both the drag coefficient and frontal area are small (see drag equation). The drag coefficient (Cd) is 0.159, compared to 0.30 - 0.40 for typical cars.

The car features an aircraft-style canopy, flat wheel covers and an underbelly cover to smooth the airflow. The engine cooling vents open only as needed.

For light weight, the car uses an unpainted carbon fibre skin over a magnesium-alloy subframe. Individual components have been designed to be low weight, including engine, transmission, suspension, wheels (carbon fibre), brakes (aluminium), hubs (titanium), bearings (ceramic), interior, and so on.

The body and frame are designed with crush/crumple zones and roll-over protection, and the tandem seating means large side crush zones. Volkswagen claims protection comparable to a GT racing car. The car has anti-lock brakes, airbags with pressure sensors, and stability control.

The engine is a one-cylinder  diesel producing just . It drives through a six-speed transmission that combines stick-shift mechanics, weight, and drive efficiency with automatic convenience and efficiency controls. There is no clutch pedal. The gear selection (forwards, reverse or neutral) is made using a switch on the right-hand side of the cockpit. The engine is switched off automatically during deceleration and stops, and auto-restarted when the acceleration pedal is pressed.

According to Volkswagen, the vehicle consumes , giving it a  driving range on one tank of fuel.

At the 2007 Frankfurt Motor Show senior VW exec Ferdinand Piëch claimed the car would be available by the end of the decade.

Around June 2008 car magazines were reporting a powerplant change to a two-cylinder diesel-electric hybrid. Volkswagen only expected the car to be a limited production run, and prices were expected by one industry insider to be between €20,000 and €30,000.

2009 model 

The second Volkswagen 1-litre car, named L1, was first shown to the public at the 2009 Frankfurt Motor Show. Limited production of the VW L1 was expected to start in 2013 but with the announcement of the XL1 in 2011 this was considered unlikely.

The L1 continues the two-seater tandem concept first shown in the 2002 1-litre concept.

It uses one half of a 1.6-litre TDI engine in a hybrid installation. The 800 cm3, twin-cylinder, common-rail turbodiesel is joined by a  electric motor and has a  emission 39 g/km. The engine operates in two modes: "eco" mode, giving , and "sport" mode giving . The electric motor provides extra acceleration and can power the L1 on its own for short distances.

2011 model 

The XL1 is the third iteration of the Volkswagen 1-litre car, unveiled at the 2011 Qatar Motor Show. The diesel plug-in hybrid prototype is branded as a "Super Efficient Vehicle" (SEV).

Like the L1, the XL1 uses a two-cylinder turbo-diesel.

Frontal area is 1.5 m2 giving a  m2.
Just 23.2% of the car is made out of either steel or iron; the drivetrain weighs . However, the car is much lower with a height of only , and has a coupe-like roofline, reducing interior volume. The design incorporates butterfly doors, with the interior seating layout using a staggered side-by-side arrangement similar to a Smart Fortwo, rather than the previous versions' tandem seating.

Production version
In February 2012, Volkswagen confirmed that it would build a limited series of XL1s starting in 2013. The production version of the plug-in diesel-electric hybrid was unveiled at the 2013 Geneva Motor Show.

Power is delivered to the rear wheels through a seven-speed dual-clutch gearbox. The wheels are fitted with low rolling resistance tyres sized 115/80 R15 (front) and 145/55 R16 (rear). The drag coefficient has increased slightly from 0.186 to 0.189.

The test cycle allows for a re-charge of the battery every  which results in a high mpg value.

One reviewer found that, in real-life traffic, with air conditioning on and without attempts at hypermiling, the car is able to reliably achieve .

Production and sales
Production began by mid 2013 and was limited to 250 units. A total of 50 units had been built by early September 2013, and the remaining 200 XL1s were scheduled to be built in the second quarter of 2014. The XL1 was available in Europe only. Retail deliveries began in Germany in June 2014.

Of the 250 units to be produced, 200 were to be sold to retail customers. Volkswagen opened a registration process for interested customers that closed on 18 October 2013. Because more than 200 potential buyers registered, a draw was conducted to select the customers with a purchase option for the available cars. They were offered a purchase contract and after the payment of a  deposit, the purchase agreement for an XL1 was binding.

Reception
The Volkswagen XL1 was selected in February 2014 as one of the top five finalists for the 2014 World Car of the Year.

See also
 Electric car use by country
 Plug-in electric vehicle
 Plug-in hybrid
 List of modern production plug-in electric vehicles

References

External links

Volkswagen press release, 15 April 2002, "The 1-litre car" (archived) 
Volkswagen press release, 15 September 2009, E-Up! and L1 (archived) 
Official Volkswagen 1-Litre car press release
Official Volkswagen L1 press release
Official Volkswagen XL1 press release
Supercars 1-litre report

Cars powered by 2-cylinder engines
1-Litre-Auto
Volkswagen Group diesel engines
Hybrid electric vehicles
Plug-in hybrid vehicles